(born January 19, 1948 in Nagoya, Japan) is a professional Go player.

Biography 
Shigeru was a disciple of Toshio Sakai. He plays in the Nagoya branch of the Nihon Ki-in, where he came close to winning the Okan title in 1980.

Runners-up

References 
 Nihon Ki-in profile 

Japanese Go players
People from Nagoya
1948 births
Living people